is a Japanese road and track cyclist, who currently rides for UCI Continental team . He won the gold medal at the 2014 Asian Games in the Men's Omnium.

He qualified to represent Japan at the 2020 Summer Olympics.

Major results

Track

2012
 National Championships
1st  Individual pursuit
1st  Team pursuit
2013
 National Championships
1st  Omnium
1st  Individual pursuit
 2nd  Team pursuit, Asian Championships
 2nd  Individual pursuit, East Asian Games
2014
 Asian Games
1st  Omnium
3rd  Team pursuit
 National Championships
1st  Points race
1st  Individual pursuit
1st  Madison (with Hiroaki Harada) 
1st  Team pursuit
 2nd  Omnium, Asian Championships
2016
 1st  Omnium, Asian Championships
2017
 1st  Omnium, National Championships
 2nd Omnium, UCI World Cup, Santiago
2018
 1st  Omnium, Asian Championships
 Asian Games
1st  Omnium
3rd  Team pursuit
3rd  Madison (with Shunsuke Imamura)
2019
 Asian Championships
1st  Omnium
2nd  Team pursuit
3rd  Madison (with Kazushige Kuboki)
 National Championships
1st  Omnium
1st  Scratch
1st  Team pursuit
1st  Madison (with Kazushige Kuboki)
3rd Individual pursuit
 3rd Omnium, UCI World Cup, Brisbane
2020
 Asian Championships
1st  Omnium
1st  Team pursuit
2nd  Madison (with Kazushige Kuboki)
 National Championships
1st  Points race
1st  Omnium
1st  Team pursuit
2021
 National Championships
1st  Team pursuit
2nd Scratch
2nd Elimination race
2nd Madison
3rd Omnium
 UCI Nations Cup, Hong Kong
1st Omnium
1st Elimination
3rd Madison (with Shunsuke Imamura)
3rd Team pursuit
2022
 Asian Championships
1st  Scratch
1st  Team pursuit
 National Championships
1st  Elimination race
2nd Madison
2nd Team pursuit
3rd Individual pursuit
3rd Omnium

Road
2013
 2nd Time trial, National Under-23 Road Championships

References

External links

Japanese male cyclists
1993 births
Living people
Asian Games medalists in cycling
Cyclists at the 2014 Asian Games
Cyclists at the 2018 Asian Games
Medalists at the 2014 Asian Games
Medalists at the 2018 Asian Games
Asian Games gold medalists for Japan
Asian Games bronze medalists for Japan
Cyclists at the 2020 Summer Olympics
Olympic cyclists of Japan
20th-century Japanese people
21st-century Japanese people
Sportspeople from Gifu Prefecture
People from Gifu
Japanese track cyclists